William Rivington Brownfield (born 1952) is a Career Ambassador in the United States Foreign Service and the former Assistant Secretary of State for the Bureau of International Narcotics and Law Enforcement Affairs as of January 10, 2011. He has previously served as U.S. Ambassador to Chile, Venezuela, and Colombia.

Biography
A career Foreign Service Officer, William Brownfield was United States Ambassador to Colombia. He arrived in Colombia on August 31, 2007, and was accredited by Colombian President Álvaro Uribe on September 12, 2007. On August 3, 2010, the United States confirmed Peter Michael McKinley as the new ambassador to Colombia.

Prior to arriving in Colombia, Brownfield was Ambassador to Venezuela, and before that Chile.

Ambassador Brownfield's first assignment after joining the Foreign Service in 1979 was in Maracaibo, Venezuela. His other overseas postings include service as Counselor for Humanitarian Affairs in Geneva, and assignments in Argentina and El Salvador. He was temporarily assigned as Political Adviser to the Commander-in-Chief, U.S. Southern Command in Panama 1989–1990.

In Washington, Ambassador Brownfield's assignments have included Deputy Assistant Secretary of State for Western Hemisphere (WHA), Director for Policy in the Bureau of International Narcotics and Law Enforcement Affairs, Executive Assistant in the Bureau of Inter-American Affairs, Member of the Secretary's Policy Planning Staff, and Special Assistant to the Under Secretary for Political Affairs.

Ambassador Brownfield is a graduate of St. Andrew's School (1970), Cornell University (1974) and the National War College (1993); he also attended the University of Texas School of Law (1976–1978).

Chávez attacks
In a nationally televised speech on April 9, 2006, Venezuelan President Hugo Chávez threatened to expel Brownfield for "provoking the Venezuelan people." Chávez said "Start packing your bags, mister - if you keep on provoking us, start packing your bags, because I'll kick you out of here."

On January 25, 2007, Brownfield was again threatened with expulsion by President Chávez. Chávez was responding to Brownfield's comments on the planned nationalization of several Venezuelan companies in which US companies are minority shareholders.

Bureau of International Narcotics and Law Enforcement Affairs
Starting on January 10, 2011, Brownfield served as Assistant Secretary of State for the Bureau of International Narcotics and Law Enforcement Affairs. In August 2017, he announced his intent to retire by the end of September. During his career, Brownfield received the Secretary's Distinguished Service Award and was a three-time recipient of the Presidential Performance Award.

Personal life
Brownfield is married to Ambassador Kristie Kenney, former Counselor of the State Department. He speaks Spanish with a pronounced Texas accent and French.

References

External links

 State Department Biography page (Assistant Secretary)
 State Department Biography page (Venezuela)
 State Department Biography page (Chile)
 Interview with William Brownfield
U.S. Embassy in Bogotá: Ambassador Brownfield

Presidential Nomination: William Rivington Brownfield

|-

|-

|-

1952 births
Living people
Ambassadors of the United States to Chile
Ambassadors of the United States to Colombia
Ambassadors of the United States to Venezuela
Cornell University alumni
People from Austin, Texas
University of Texas School of Law alumni
United States Career Ambassadors
United States Assistant Secretaries of State
United States Foreign Service personnel